Lake Washington is a lake in the town of Glocester, Providence County, Rhode Island.

References

External links 
 Rhode Island public boat launching sites

Glocester, Rhode Island
Lakes of Rhode Island
Lakes of Providence County, Rhode Island